Japan competed at the 2011 World Championships in Athletics from August 27 to September 4 in Daegu, South Korea.

Team selection

The country will send a 50-member squad to compete at the event. The final team composition was announced following the conclusion of the Asian Championships in Kobe, Japan, the final qualifying meeting as designated by the Japan Association of Athletics Federations.

The final team on the entry list comprises the names of 52 athletes, including 2 athletes invited by the IPC for exhibition
events: Jun Hiromichi, 400m T53 (wheelchair) men, and Wakako Tsuchida, 800m T54 (wheelchair) women.

The following athletes appeared on the preliminary Entry List, but not on the Official Start List of the specific event, resulting in a total number of 48 competitors:

Medalists
 

The following competitor from Japan won a medal at the Championships  
 
| width="78%" align="left" valign="top" |

Results

Men

Decathlon

Women

References

External links
Official local organising committee website
Official IAAF competition website

Nations at the 2011 World Championships in Athletics
World Championships in Athletics
Japan at the World Championships in Athletics